The year 2023 is the twelfth year in the history of Glory, an international kickboxing promotion. 

The events were broadcast on various streaming services and television channels such as Videoland, Viaplay and Go3. Events were also streamed on the Glory Fights Pay-per-view platform.

List of events

Glory Rivals 5

Glory Rivals 5 was  a kickboxing event held by Glory in partnership with War of Nation on January 28, 2023, in Tulum, Mexico.

Background
The event was headlined by a featherweight bout between Abraham Vidales and promotional newcomer Tomás Aguirre.

Fight Card

Glory 83

Glory 83 was a kickboxing event held by Glory on February 11, 2023, in Essen, Germany.

Background
Two championships bouts were booked for the event: Sergej Maslobojev made his maiden Glory Light Heavyweight Championship defense against Donegi Abena, while Donovan Wisse was expected to make his second Glory Middleweight Championship defense against César Almeida. However, Almeida missed weight and the bout was changed to a three-round, non-title match.

A welterweight bout between Joilton Lutterbach and Dynamite Fighting Show's Diaguely Camara, ranked No.1 light heavyweight in France, took place at the event.

A lightweight bout between former OSS Fighters top contender Chris Wunn and promotional newcomer and current SUPERKOMBAT World Super Lightweight Champion Jonathan Mayezo was scheduled for the event. 

A lightweight bout between undefeated promotional newcomer and former Colosseum Tournament super lightweight and lightweight double-world champion Sorin Căliniuc and former SUPERKOMBAT World Middleweight Championship challenger (also former ISKA World Light Middleweight Champion) Arman Hambaryan took place at the event.

Fight Card

Glory 84

Glory 84 will be a kickboxing event held by Glory on March 11, 2023, in Rotterdam, Netherlands.

Background
A Glory Lightweight Championship bout between current champion Tyjani Beztati and current Glory Featherweight Champion Petpanomrung Kiatmuu9 is expected to headline the event.

A light heavyweight bout between former Glory Light Heavyweight title challenger Tarik Khbabez (also the 2015 Superkombat Heavyweight World Grand Prix Winner) and Kristpas Zile is expected to take place at the event.

A welterweight bout between former WFL Welterweight Champion Jay Overmeer and Superkombat World Grand Prix II light heavyweight tournament winner Jamie Bates is expected to place as the co-main event.

A middleweight bout between former two-time WFL Middleweight Champion Ertugrul Bayrak and former Golden Fighter Championship top contender Michael Boapeah  was scheduled for the event. 

A welterweight bout between undefeated promotional newcomer and former Colosseum Tournament world welterweight champion Ștefan Orza and former KOK world welterweight champion (also a promotional newcomer) Chico Kwasi.

Fight card

Glory 85

Glory 85 will be a kickboxing event held by Glory on April 29, 2023.

Background
The event will see a four-man heavyweight tournament which will serve as a qualifier for the upcoming 2023 GLORY Grand Prix. Moreover, the winner of this tournament will challenge for the Interim Heavyweight Championship against top ranked contender Antonio Plazibat.

Four Man Glory Heavyweight Tournament bracket

Fight Card

Glory: Collision 5 

Glory: Collision 5 is an upcoming kickboxing event held by Glory on June 17, 2023.

Background
The event will host a Interim Heavyweight Championship fight between Antonio Plazibat and the winner of the Glory 85 four-man tournament.

Fight Card

See also 
 2023 in ONE Championship
 2023 in K-1 
 2023 in Romanian kickboxing
 2023 in Wu Lin Feng

References

External links
Official website

Glory (kickboxing) events
2023 in kickboxing
2023 sport-related lists
2023 in Dutch sport